This is a list of USC Trojans football players in the NFL Draft.

Key

Selections

Notes
Manuel Wright was drafted in the 2005 NFL Supplemental Draft.
Malcolm Moore was drafted in the 1984 NFL Supplemental Draft.

Notable undrafted players
Note: No drafts held before 1920

References

Usc Trojans

USC Trojans NFL Draft